Blake Andrew Spence (born June 20, 1975) is a former American football tight end in the National Football League who played for the New York Jets and Tampa Bay Buccaneers. He played college football for the Oregon Ducks.

Spence had a blocked punt in the 1999 AFC Championship Game.

References

1975 births
Living people
American football tight ends
New York Jets players
Tampa Bay Buccaneers players
Oregon Ducks football players